The Isabella Breviary (Ms. 18851) is a late 15th-century illuminated manuscript housed in the British Library, London. Queen Isabella I of Castile was given the manuscript shortly before 1497 by her ambassador Francisco de Rojas to commemorate the double marriage of her children and the children of Emperor Maximilian of Austria and Duchess Mary of Burgundy.

Origin 

The work known as the breviary of Isabella I of Castile is a Breviarium Romanum made in Flanders for a Castilian nobleman Francisco de Rojas near the end of the 15th century. It was a present for Isabel at the occasion of the marriage of her children with the children of Maximilian.

Francisco de Rojas y Escobar was a Castilian diplomat who carried out several important diplomatic missions for Ferdinand. He negotiated the marriage between Infante Juan, the Crown Prince, and Margaret of Austria and Philip the Handsome and Infanta Joanna of Castile. The negotiations were finalized in 1495. The marriage of Joanna and Philip took place on 20 October 1496 in Lier and that of Juan and Margaret on 3 April 1497 in Burgos. On folio 436 verso of the manuscript, the arms of the Catholic Monarchs and of both the Wedding couples are painted.

Description 

The manuscript is written in medieval Latin and was made according to the Dominican use.
It contains 523 folios measuring 230 x 160 mm. and the ruled space is 135 x 95 mm. The text is written in a round gothic script (gotica rotunda) in two columns of 34 lines. Columns and lines are ruled with red ink, but the ruling is barely visible.

The manuscript contains 170 miniatures and is one of the most lavishly decorated breviaries that were preserved. The miniatures are distributed as follows:
 Calendar: 12
 Proprium de tempore: 50
 Psalter: 27
 Proprium et commune Sanctorum: 81
One can find two types of miniatures in the codex, page wide and column wide ones. There are 44 page wide miniatures and most of them are 24 lines high. One has a height of 26 lines, two of them are 19 lines high and one is only 18 lines high. In addition there are 104 column wide paintings whose height varies between nine and nineteen lines. Furthermore, the manuscript has twelve calendar pages, one full-page miniature and a folio with coats of arms and mottos on banners. It also counts eight historiated initials one of which remained unfinished.

The calendar is of the Flemish type: not all days are assigned to a saint or a typical office for a feast day, a lot of the days of the month is left open.

Starting from folio 402 the parchment is slightly different from that used before, but also the style of the handwriting, the initials and the illumination are different from the previous part of the book. And there are also differences in the lay-out, the responsories were smaller than the remainder of the text in the first part while this is no longer so from folio 402 on, with the exception of the quire that contains the folios 499-506. So scholars think that the manuscript was made in two campaigns.

Breviaries for lay use 
This breviary was not the only one in Isabella's collection; the queen owned at least twenty breviaries, according to the inventory reconstituted by Elisa Ruiz García. We can only guess why Isabella collected so many breviaries.  While it was usual in those days that the noble ladies had a book of hours for their personal devotion, a breviary was a book for the clergy. It is quite possible that, since books of hours were in the possession of the "general public", and since the upper middle class possessed luxurious versions, the highest class strove to distinguish themselves with a more "professional" prayer book, namely a breviary. Its larger format further distinguished the Isabella Breviary by accommodating a completely different illumination program.

Many breviaries were highly decorated and were a symbol of status but often they serve very few practical purposes as they were expensive, heavy and difficult to transport without damaging them. Therefore other small versions of a breviaries were used and they were commonly called Book of hours. Upon Isabel's death they auctioned many of her breviaries and books of hours. One of this examples published in Spanish by Philippe Pigouchet in 1498 was sold for 51 Maravedí in the auction (pp 551) and can be download here.

The first breviaries for lay use were made for the French royal house. Their example was soon followed by the Dukes of Burgundy of the house of Valois-Burgundy and later on by the Spanish and Portuguese royal families.

Some of the famous medieval breviaries:
 Breviary of Philippe le Bel, ca. 1290-1295, BnF Latin 1023.
 Belleville-breviarium Paris 1323-1326, BnF, Ms. Lat. 10484 view on line
 Breviary of Philip the Good, Brussels, Royal Library of Belgium, 9511 en 9026
 Breviary of Henri de Lorraine, Chazy (New York), Alice T. Miner museum
 Breviary of Eleanor of Portugal, New York, Morgan Library 2287
 Breviary of Charles V of France BnF ms. lat 1052
 Breviary of Marie de Savoie, Bibliothèque municipale de Chamberry some images on line
 Breviary van Martin of Aragon, Paris, BnF, Rothschild 2529 View on line
 Breviary of Mattias Corvinus Rome, Vatican Library Urb. Lat. 112
 Breviary of Monte cassino, Paris, Bibliothèque Mazarine, Ms 364 / 20 some images on line
 Breviary of Renaud de Bar (Winter part), Verdun, Bibliothèque municipale de Verdun, Bm 107 View on line 
 Breviary of Renaud de Bar (Summer part), London, British Library
 Grimani Breviarium, Venice, Biblioteca Marciana, Ms. Lat.X167(7531) view on line
 Breviarium Mayer van den Bergh, Antwerp, Museum Mayer van den Bergh

History 
It is not known who had the breviary after the death of Isabella, or even during her lifetime. In his work of 1883 Waagen reports that it was taken by the French from the Escorial during the War of the Pyrenees in 1794.

In 1815, the work was in the possession of John Dent, a British collector. In 1817 it was described by Thomas Frognall Dibdin.  After the death of Dent in 1826, his collection was sold in 1827 at an auction held by Robert Harding Evans and in the catalogue four pages were devoted to the Breviary. In this catalogue that a faulty interpretation of the text of Francisco Rojas was given; it led to the story that the book was in honour of Isabella's support for the expedition of Christopher Columbus. The Breviary was sold for £378  to Philip Hurd, member of the Inner Temple.

Five years later, after Hurd died, the codex was once again sold on an auction at Evans and acquired by John Soane, the architect, for the sum of £520  Soane sold the breviary to Sir John Tobin for £645; Tobin had bought the noted Bedford Hours at the auction by Evans where Soane bought the Isabella Breviary, and in 1833 he bought a book of hours of Joanna of Castile (add. 18852).

While the manuscript was in the possession of Tobin, Frederic Madden and the German art historian Gustav Friedrich Waagen were given the opportunity to study the manuscript. Waagen was very impressed by the miniature of St. John at Patmos (f309r), attributed today to Gerard David.

Upon Sir John's death in 1851 the collection went to his son, the Rev. John Tobin of Liscard Hall. He was approached by the bookseller William Boone who offered him £1900 for the complete collection (eight manuscripts) from his father. After the deal was closed, Boone tried to vainly sell the manuscripts to Bertram Ashburnham, 4th Earl of Ashburnham. He then offered the collection to the British Museum for £3000 and after some hesitation over the price, the trustees agreed.

Content 
A breviary contains the public or canonical prayers, hymns, the Psalms, readings, and notations for everyday use, especially by bishops, priests, monks, and deacons in the Divine Office (i.e., at the canonical hours or Liturgy of the Hours. The core of the breviaries as they were in use in medieval times was the Psalter with the 150 psalms attributed to King David. In the monasteries these 150 psalms were to be recited every week and Benedict of Nursia was one of the first to set up a scheme to plan the recitation of the psalms over the week and this scheme was readily accepted. Gradually other prayers like antiphons, hymns, canticles, readings from the script, versicles and collects were added to the daily prayers and eventually a large number of different books were needed. The breviary was a collection of all the prayers that were needed to recite the daily office The first occurrence of a single manuscript of the daily office was written by the Benedictine order at Monte Cassino in Italy in 1099 but the real breakthrough came with the advent of the mendicant friars who travelled around a lot and needed a shortened, or abbreviated, daily office contained in one portable book

The Isabella Breviary contains the standard sections of a Dominican breviary as they were established by Hubert de Romans, superior of the order between 1254 and 1277 (for details see the list hereunder).

Calendar 
The calendar is a calendar based on the standardised Dominican calendar drawn up by Humbert of Romans. During the third quarter of the 13th century A number of changes to the original calendar were implemented after approval by the General- Chapter of the Dominicans, but sometimes it took a long time before those changes were seen in all the monasteries.

The calendar includes several feasts of saints venerated typically by the Dominicans (see list below).

The calendar gives for every feast day the ranking: memoria, iii lectiones, simplex, semiduplex, duplex and totum duplex. This ranking is used to decide on the prayers that should be recited if the feast day of a saint coincides with a variable feast day. The used terminology is typical for the Dominicans and on the folios 203r – 208r a rubric explains how one should proceed.

Besides the feast days, the calendar contains also the computistical entries necessary to determine the day of the week corresponding to a given calendar date. In the first column one can find the golden number and in the second the Dominical letter. In the third column the date is expressed in the according to the Roman calendar with kalendae, nonae and idus. Also the date on which the sun enters a zodiacal sign is indicated in the calendar.

In the heading for each month the number of days and lunar days is given and the length of day and night is indicated.

The proprium de tempore 

The proprium de tempore or temporal contains the prayers for the liturgical year, according to the calendar and starting with the Advent. The temporal specifies the prayers to be recited for the daily hours of the Divine Office: Matins, Lauds, Prime, Terce, Sext, None, Vespers and Compline.  The prayers consist of psalms, antiphons, versicles, responses, hymns, readings from the Old and New Testaments, sermons of the Fathers and the like. The recurring prayers like the hymns, psalms and canticles are normally not repeated in the breviary but are identified by a reference to the section of the book where the prayer in question can be found, but in the Isabella Breviary the hymns were integrated in the temporal and the Sanctoral, the manuscript has no separate hymnarium. The references to the psalms etc. are written in read ink and are called rubrics.

When one tries to read the temporal or the sanctoral it will be noted that the office for  Sundays and major holidays start with the Vespers of the previous day. This was standard practice, the celebration of a feast began with the vigil the night before.

The Isabella Breviary is also quite exceptional by the fact that the temporal is divided in two parts by the Psalter. This could mean that the original source from which the breviary was copied, may have consisted of two parts, a winter and a summer breviary and that during the writing of the text of the Isabella Breviary, someone decided to create it as a single volume. A winter and a summer breviary normally contain each the entire Psalter between the temporal and the sanctoral.  The Isabella Breviary was probably made in two campaigns.  The first campaign stopped when the winter part of the temporal and the Psalter were completed but before the winter part of the sanctoral was written. In the second phase the scribe continued with the summer part of the temporal, followed by a complete sanctoral and the remaining sections.

The Psalter 

The Psalter in the Isabella Breviary consists of the 150 psalms of the Book of Psalms the first book of the "Writings", the third section of the Hebrew bible. In the Jewish and Western Christian tradition there are 150 psalms. The order in which they should be recited during the week depends on the liturgical use. The Isabella Breviary followed the Dominican use that is summarized in the table here under. The psalms are numbered here according to the medieval vulgate, later versions and translations like the KJV use a different numbering.

In the Psalter of the breviary, the psalms are in numerical order starting with psalm 1 "Beatus vir" up to psalm 150 "Laudate dominum", such a Psalter is called a "Psalterium non feriatum", but in the Isabella Breviary some psalms are copied a second time and grouped with another psalm to make it easier for the user. An example hereof is psalm 53 ("Deus in nomine tue") that figures on f139v in de numerical order but is repeated on f176r prior to psalm 118 because they are recited in that order during prime on every weekday. Another example is psalm 94 that can be found on f111v at the very beginning of the Psalter and also on f161v in numerical order.

The proprium Sanctorum 

The proprium Sanctorum or Sanctoral is functionally equivalent to the Temporal. It contains the offices to be used on the saints’ days. Normally there should be a one-to-one correspondence between the calendar and the Sanctoral, but like in most breviaries there are some minor differences.

The decoration 

One of the purposes of the decoration of a manuscript like Isabella's Breviary was to make it easier to use the book by structuring the text. A strict hierarchy can be recognized in the decoration. The largest miniatures are used to mark the most important sections or feasts, the smaller ones indicate subsections or less important Sundays or feasts. Initials and border decoration are used to complement miniatures or to mark divisions of the text like. individual psalms and psalm verses.

In the winter part of the Temporal de page-wide miniatures are used for the main Sundays and for the feast days in the week. Lesser Sundays are illustrated with a column-wide miniature and weekdays with a partial border and a large ornamental initial. The Matins of Maundy Thursday are illustrated with 16 column-wide miniatures illustrating the passion of Christ

In the Psalter the page-wide miniatures were used to illustrate the opening psalm in the Matins for Sunday and the weekdays (1, 26, 38, 52, 68, 80 and 97) but also the Vespers on Sunday and the Gradual Psalms are marked with a page-wide miniature. The opening psalms for the Vespers of the other days and for the lesser hours are illustrated with a small miniature.

The page-wide miniatures are used in the summer part for the important feasts (Easter, Ascension, Pentecost, Trinity Sunday and three other Sundays.

In the Sanctoral the page-wide miniatures are reserved for the great saints and the typical Dominican saints. A number of saints’ offices are illustrated with a column-wide miniature and some with a historiated initial. The use of historiated initials is limited to the first folia of the Sanctoral.  Probably the initial plan was to use historiated initials and then later on it was decided to use small miniatures instead.

Page-wide miniatures 

The manuscript contains a number of miniatures that are page wide and 24 lines high except a couple of them in the Sanctoral. These miniatures are always accompanied by a complete border decoration (4 sides) and a large decorated initial of eight lines. In the table hereunder the feasts illustrated with a page wide miniature are listed.

List of page-wide miniatures

Column-wide miniatures

Temporal 

Within the major sections the text is divided by column-wide miniatures. The second, third and fourth Sunday of the advent for example are marked with a miniature of 13 or 14 lines high and a four-sided border decoration.

The important feast days in the Christmastide are Christmas, the Circumcision of Jesus and the Adoration of the Magi, which are illustrated by a page-wide miniature. The Sundays after the octave of the Epiphany and the beginning of the Easter cycle are indicated by an initial of eight lines high and a three-sided margin decoration. The first Sunday of the Easter cycle is marked with a page-wide miniature, but the Sundays before the start of Lent and Ash Wednesday have small miniatures. From the first Sunday of lent up to Easter, all Sundays and feast-days are indicated with a large miniature. After Easter up to the beginning of the Advent, all Sundays have a small miniature except the important feasts and the first Sunday of August and September.

Elsewhere, small miniatures are used to illustrate the text, as is the case with the Passion of Christ on the folia 101r to 104r.

Psalter 

Also in the Psalter there are numerous psalms illustrated with a small miniature based on the text of the psalm or the psalm commentaries from Nicholas of Lyra  In the Psalter the small miniatures are used to point to the beginning of psalms for Vespers of the week and the beginning of the small tidal psalms (prime, tierce, sext and none). The initial Psalms of Lauds and Compline are not represented by a miniature.

Canticles and Litany 

The text of the canticles, prayers or hymns from the Bible, of the Old Testament and the New Testament is illustrated with a few small miniatures

The Common of Saints 

The beginning of the Common of Saints on f499r is announced by a column-wide miniature of  12 lines high representing the twelve apostles. This page has also a four sided margin decoration. It is the last, fully decorated page in the manuscript.

The sections of the Common are marked with a decorated initial of four lines high but without miniatures or historiated initials.

Sanctoral 

The largest number of illustrations can be found in the Proprium Sanctorum or Sanctoral, 81 of the 178 feasts are illustrated with a miniature. The Sanctoral contains almost half of the 170 miniatures illuminating the manuscript. The choice of ventilation depends on the 'use' of the breviary. In a breviary for use Dominican people will make different selections than in a breviary for Cistercian use. The choice of the saints to represent, aside from the major saints that are found in any breviary, depends of course on the “use” of the breviary but also on the preferences of the customer or the person for whom the book was intended. Considering that this manuscript was made for Dominican use, the Dominican saints like Dominic, Thomas Aquinas, Peter of Verona, Vincent Ferrer, Catherine of Siena and Procopius take an important place.

Also here, small pictures were used as a kind of bookmarks but also to illustrate the symbols of the saint with possibly a representation of his martyrdom, or a special event in his life. In the list below, one can see a full list of the miniatures, with a brief description. The page-wide miniatures are included in the list. The dates of the holidays in this list may differ from the dates that can be found in the modern Calendar of saints because the Dominican calendar sometimes differs from the Roman calendar some feast-days have changed since the Middle Ages.

The calendar miniatures 

The calendar miniatures are not a part of the hierarchical system described above, they are not intended to structure or clarify the text, but are purely decorative. The calendar miniatures are the only real full-page miniatures in the manuscript. They seem to have been set up as a kind of full-page miniature of a landscape in which the works of the month were displayed. Over the (virtual) central part of that landscape, the calendar text is written.  The zodiac sign of the month is always placed in the upper left or right corner.

The use of real full-page miniatures for the calendar started in France in the third quarter of the fifteenth century. In the Très Riches Heures du Duc de Berry, the Limbourg Brothers used full-page miniatures of the works of the month facing the calendar page. Their invention was scarcely followed by other artists until it was picked up by Flemish painters in the beginning of the sixteenth century as for example in the Grimani Breviary. The Isabella Breviary was one of the earliest manuscripts in which the technique of "overwritten" full-page miniatures for the calendar was applied.

Initials 

This manuscript contains literally thousands of decorated initials.  They are between one and eight lines high.  All the characters are drawn with blue or purple ink on a gold ground, and parts of the initials are decorated with geometric motifs in white.  The open space within the initial is usually decorated with vines or floral motifs, sometimes with geometric structures.  For the larger initials the corners are often cut.  The initials are, like the miniatures, also used to structure the text.  For example, in the Psalter each psalm starts with an initial of 3 lines high.

Line fillers 

If the line is ending with a blank space, this is filled with a gold bar which buds, tendrils or geometric motifs.  In the Psalter this line fillers are widespread, they are used to mark the end of the verses.  Sometimes, instead of the gold bar, a kind of chain of o's written in red ink is used.

Borders 

Margin decoration is also extensively used in the manuscript.  Each page with a large or small miniature has a full, four-sided border decoration.  The decoration is also applied in the space between the two text columns.

It Isabella Breviary one can find the already outmoded French border decoration alongside scatter borders invented in Flanders around 1470.

French border decoration originated in Paris in the early 15th century in the vicinity of the Boucicaut Master and the Bedford Master.  This type was adopted in Flanders and further developed.  To emphasize the distinction with the then ultramodern Ghent-Bruges style it is called "outmoded" French here.  The Ghent-Bruges style of border decoration was first used around 1470 in the vicinity of the Master of Mary of Burgundy, Lieven van Lathem, and the master of Margaret of York.

The outmoded border decorations were painted on the blank parchment.  There are two variants of this.  The first (type-a) has delicate acanthus scrolls painted in blue and gold, with strawberries, small flowers, leaves and twigs and small gold dots.  The other version (type-b) has the same features but with only blue, gold, and black (see example).

In the "modern" Ghent-Bruges style, the border decoration is painted on a painted background, usually painted in yellow.  The proper decoration is then painted on the coloured border.  Also for this type of border we can distinguish different types.

In the first variant the artist uses broad acanthus branches in white or gold, sometimes knotted or interwoven.  Between the acanthus there are thin-stemmed flowers, some strawberries, insects and birds. Here and there we see human figures or between branches climbing the branches (see example).

The second variant consists of much thinner acanthus tendrils sprouting flowers (see example). .

The third variant are the so-called the scatter borders, where flowers and flower buds are scattered over the painted border (see example).

Sometimes the outmoded French borders are combined with a narrow scatter border that is surrounding the text ore miniature.  The scatter borders and the outmoded French borders are the most commonly used types throughout the manuscript..

Here and there the border decoration is completely different.  Some borders have the appearance of fabric, or consist of text written in large capital letters.  A good example of such a fabric margin can be seen on the miniature with Saint Barbara at the top of the article.

Examples of the different types of border decoration.

In addition to the four-side full page borders, or framing three sides of it, one van find also partial borders ranging from a couple of lines high to full-page height. These small borders are used together with decorated initials to structure the text. This type of decoration can be found on literally every page of the manuscript and in that context, one can say that all the 1048 pages of the book are decorated (with the exception of  a couple completely blank pages.

Full-page border decoration is generally used on a page with a miniature, be it small or large, but here and there one can find full-page border decoration in combination with large initials as introduction of a new section in the manuscript where no miniature was planned. Examples of this situation can be found on folios  13r, 13v and 14r with the prayers for the days of the first week of Advent.

The artists

Master of the Dresden Prayer Book 

The largest number of miniatures was painted by the artist known as the Master of the Dresden Prayer Book. There are one full-page miniature, 32 page-wide en 52 column-wide miniatures attributed to this master.
This master eschewed the use of models and his inventivity in the illumination of the Isabella Breviary is remarkable. The iconography used in his illustrations of the Psalter was completely new in Flanders. Admittedly, the miniatures were based on newly published theological works, but it seems unlikely that the miniaturist had read these works himself. He was probably advised by a theologian and it would not be surprising if it would have been a Dominican.

Dating the contributions of the Master of the Dresden Prayer Book remains a difficult issue.  Until recently, his work in the manuscript was dated according to the inscription on folio 437r around the time of the double marriage and the presence of Francisco de Rojas in Flanders, thus in the 1490s.  But recent research,  dates the work on stylistic grounds, earlier in the previous decade, so in the 1480s, and before 1488 when the Master of the Dresden Prayer Book left Bruges for several years, returning after 1492 when the political situation in Bruges was stable again..

Calendar Master 

The illustration of the calendar was probably realised in the same period as the work of the Dresden master, but although the latter was specialised in calendar illumination, this part of the work is not from his hand. The illuminator who painted the calendar was also involved in the realisation of the border decoration in the Ghent-Bruges style variant 1, with the broad acanthus branches. The characters he painted here and there in the borders are very similar to those in the calendar. The calendar is artistically the weakest part of the illumination of the breviary.

Gerard David 

When Gustav Friedrich Waagen studied the book for the first time in 1838, he already noted that four of the miniatures were of an exceptional quality: the miniature with the nativity scene at f29r, the Adoration of the Magi on f41r, St. Barbara on f297r and John on Patmos on f309r. Waagen knew very well the Adoration of the Magi kept in the Alte Pinakothek in Munich and attributed to Gerard David but he did not attribute the very similar miniature in the Isabella Breviary to David, but in his opinion, the four miniatures were of the same hand. Recent research attributes these miniatures to Gerard David but the discussion between scholars about this attribution is ongoing. The similarity in composition between the miniature and the painting is striking, but the miniature can of course be painted by another miniaturist who based his composition on the work of David.  In any case it is recognised more and more that Gerard David played an important role in the late miniature art in Flanders.
The difference between these four miniatures and the rest of the miniatures in the first campaign by the master of Dresden is obvious.  The velvety surface, the rich colour palette and the refined modelling of these miniatures sets them apart from the other in the first part.  Detailed study learns that the foreground and background of the St. Barbara (f297r) have been painted with different techniques and that is also the case for the left part of the landscape on the miniature of John (f09r).

Master of James IV of Scotland 

Also this illuminator is only known to us through a nickname, some scholars identify him as Gerard Horenbout while others don't agree at all. The painter's name is derived from a portrait of James IV of Scotland which, together with one of his Queen, is in the Prayer book of James IV and Queen Margaret, a book of hours commissioned by James and now in Vienna in the Austrian National Library as Cod. 1897. Het was one of the great illuminators in the period between 1480 and 1530 and apart from the Isabella Breviary, he was involved in the illumination of the Breviarium Mayer van den Bergh and of the Breviarium Grimani.

The Master of James IV of Scotland was responsible for 48 miniatures in the second part of the Isabella Breviary, the second half of the Sanctoral. In this part of the manuscript all the miniatures are column-wide except those on ff. 437r, 477v and 481r (The raising of Lazarus) . These miniatures are less high then the large ones in the first part of the breviary. Through comparison with his other work, his contribution is dated in the 1490s.
A typical difference between the miniatures realised by the Dresden master and those painted by the James master is that the latter are always framed with a three-dimensional golden frame.

Later updates 

We saw that the Master of the Dresden Prayer Book finished his work on folio 358 recto and the Master of James IV of Scotland started on folio 404 verso. The miniatures in the intermediate quires must therefore be attributed to other illuminators.

English artist, early 19th century 

We know from the description of the manuscript by Dibdin that in his time the miniature of Saint Catharina was lacking. In light here of, and based on the modern style and painting technique reminiscent of oil painting, this miniature and four small column-wide miniatures (f363r, f364r, f367r and f385v) must be assigned to an early 19th-century English artist.

Spanish artist ca. 1500 

The other miniatures that were not performed, nor in the campaign of the master of Dresden, or in the second campaign with the Master of James IV of Scotland, are assigned to one hand. Based on style and on the clothing of the figures, the classical temple on f399r it is thought that this must have been an artist of Spanish origin.
It remains an open question whether this Spanish artist made these miniatures after the second campaign in 1500, or that he was appointed to finish the book after the first campaign around 1488. In the second case, he must have been removed from that job because of a significantly lower quality of his work.

Sources, references and notes 

Sources
 Janet Backhouse, The Isabella Breviary, London, The British Library, 1993
 Scot McKendrick, Elisa Riuz Garcia, Nigel Morgan, The Isabella Breviary, The British Library, London Add. Ms. 18851, Barcelona, Moleiro, 2012

References to The Isabella Breviary

General references

Notes

External links 

 London, British Library, Add. MS 18851: complete digitization
 Moleiro facsimile with references to miniatures

15th-century illuminated manuscripts
Illuminated breviaries